Get Lucky is the sixth solo studio album by British singer-songwriter and guitarist Mark Knopfler, released on 14 September 2009 in Europe by Mercury Records, and on 15 September in the United States by Reprise Records. The album was released in four formats, including CD, a Limited Edition CD/DVD Digipak, a Deluxe Edition Boxset, and a double vinyl album. Get Lucky received generally favorable reviews, and reached the top three positions on album charts in Denmark, Germany, Italy, the Netherlands, Norway, and Poland. The album peaked at number nine in the United Kingdom, and number 17 in the United States.

Recording
Get Lucky was recorded at British Grove Studios in London between October 2008 and March 2009.

Release
Get Lucky was released on 14 September 2009 in four formats. The Standard International version is a CD containing eleven songs. The Limited Edition version is a CD/DVD Digipak, which includes a tour of British Grove Studio conducted by Mark and Chuck Ainlay. The Deluxe Edition Boxset contains 3 engraved poker chips, 2 branded poker craps, a guitar tab for the title track, 2 180g vinyl LPs, a facsimile gig ticket, and a DVD containing 1 acoustic track performed live, a video tour of British Grove Studios with interviews, and a short 20-minute film. The Vinyl Edition version is a double vinyl LP.

Composition
The song "The Car Was the One" is based on a story in The Unfair Advantage, an autobiography by race car driver Mark Donohue.

Touring

Knopfler promoted the album with two tours in 2010. The North American tour started on 8 April 2010 in Seattle, Washington, and included 28 concerts in 27 cities, ending on 9 May 2010 in Albany, New York. The European tour started on 9 September 2010 in London, UK, and included 60 concerts in 52 cities, ending on 31 July 2010 in Ávila, Spain. The tour included a six-night run at the Royal Albert Hall in London.

Critical reception

Get Lucky received generally positive reviews from music critics. On the review aggregator website Metacritic, the album holds a Metascore of 63, meaning the album has received "generally favourable reviews". In his review for AllMusic, William Ruhlmann gave the album three and a half out of five stars, noting that although Glasgow-born Knopfler comes by the Celtic influence honestly, he "seems to be trying to create his own pseudo-traditional repertoire of what often sound like old folk songs." In his review for Sound & Vision, Mike Mettler gave the album four and a half out of five stars, noting that Knopfler "continues to evolve as a storyteller who's never afraid of shying away from rock theatrics to explore his considerable British roots."

In his review for PopMatters, Michael Kabran gave the album seven out of ten stars, noting that the album is "filled with sweeping strings, subtle melodies, bluesy guitar bits, and Knopfler’s usual smart lyrics." Kabran concluded, "Knopfler has created an enjoyable collection of blues shuffles, countrified ballads, and Celtic-influenced folk songs that deserves attention and, perhaps most important, deserves to stand on its own." In his review for AbsolutePunk, Thomas Nassiff gave the album a 95% rating, praising the album's "refreshing insight" and "phenomenal songwriting". In his review for Rolling Stone, Michael Tremmel gave the album four out of five stars.

Track listing
All songs were written by Mark Knopfler.

iTunes and Amazon bonus tracks

Deluxe Edition bonus tracks

Personnel
 Mark Knopfler – vocals, guitar
 Richard Bennett – guitar
 John McCusker – violin, cittern
 Matt Rollings – keyboards
 Guy Fletcher – keyboards, string arrangements
 Glenn Worf – bass guitar, string bass
 Danny Cummings – drums
 Phil Cunningham – accordion (1,4,10,11)
 Michael McGoldrick – flute, whistle (1,4,10,11)
 Rupert Gregson-Williams – strings conductor, French horn

Production
 Mark Knopfler – producer
 Guy Fletcher – co-producer, engineer
 Chuck Ainlay – co-producer, engineer
 Rich Cooper – assistant engineer
 Martin Hollis – assistant engineer
 Bob Ludwig – mastering at Gateway Mastering Studios in Portland, Maine

Charts

Album charts

Year-end charts

Certifications

References

External links
 Get Lucky at Mark Knopfler official website

Mark Knopfler albums
2009 albums
Albums produced by Mark Knopfler
Albums produced by Chuck Ainlay
Albums produced by Guy Fletcher
Mercury Records albums
Reprise Records albums